Barnett Clinedinst may refer to:

Barnett M. Clinedinst (1835–1900), American photographer and inventor
Barnett McFee Clinedinst (1862–1953), official White House photographer